Events from the year 1960 in the United Kingdom.

Incumbents
 Monarch – Elizabeth II
 Prime Minister – Harold Macmillan (Conservative)
 Parliament – 42nd

Events
January – The state of emergency is lifted in Kenya: the Mau Mau Uprising is officially over.
5 January – Closure of the Swansea and Mumbles Railway (opened to passengers in 1807 and by this date operated by double-decker electric trams).
10 January – British Prime Minister Harold Macmillan makes the "Wind of Change" speech for the first time, to little publicity, in Accra, Gold Coast (modern-day Ghana).
28 January – The comic ballet La fille mal gardée, in a version newly choreographed by Frederick Ashton to a score adapted by John Lanchbery, is premiered by The Royal Ballet at the Royal Opera House in London, rapidly becoming a classic of the repertoire.
3 February – Macmillan makes the "Wind of Change" speech to the South African Parliament in Cape Town where it attracts attention. (It was drafted by David Hunt.)
18–28 February – Great Britain and Northern Ireland compete at the Winter Olympics in Squaw Valley, Placer County, California but do not win any medals.
19 February – The Queen gives birth to her third child and second son, the first child born to a reigning British monarch since 1857.
March
Manchester City F.C. sign 20-year-old forward Denis Law for a national record fee of £55,000 from Huddersfield Town.
The 18th century Naval dockyard at Sheerness on the Isle of Sheppey in Kent is closed. A total of 2,500 jobs have gradually been shed at the site since its closure was first announced by the government in February 1958.
14 March – Jodrell Bank Observatory makes contact with the American Pioneer 5 over a record-breaking distance of 407,000 miles.
26 March – The Grand National is televised for the first time. The winner is Merryman II.
28 March – Cheapside Street Whisky Bond Fire in Glasgow. 19 firemen killed in the UK's worst peacetime fire services disaster.
1 April – Bill Griggs of Northampton first markets the Dr. Martens 'AirWair' style 1460 boots.
8 April – The seven-week-old son of the Queen and the Duke of Edinburgh is christened Andrew Albert Christian Edward (he later becomes Prince Andrew, Duke of York).
13 April – Cancellation of the Blue Streak missile as a military project.
16 April – The Times of London abandons use of the term "Imperial and Foreign News", replacing it with "Overseas News" and changes its house style from "to-day" to "today".
17 April – American rock and roll singer Eddie Cochran, 21, is killed in a car crash in Wiltshire.
18 April – 60,000 protestors stage a demonstration in London against nuclear weapons.
27 April – The first production of Harold Pinter's play The Caretaker takes place at the Arts Theatre in London.
30 April – Yorkshire County Cricket Club opens its first season since 1883 under a professional captain, Vic Wilson, who leads the club to the County Championship.
3 May – Burnley F.C. win the Football League First Division title with a 2–1 win over Manchester City at Maine Road. Burnley's title win means that Wolverhampton Wanderers, the FA Cup finalists, have lost out on the chance of becoming the first team this century to win the double of the league title and FA Cup.
6 May – Princess Margaret marries photographer Antony Armstrong-Jones at Westminster Abbey in the first televised Royal marriage.
7 May – Wolverhampton Wanderers are FA Cup winners for the fourth time, beating Blackburn Rovers 3–0 at Wembley Stadium.
22 June – A fire in a Liverpool department store kills eleven.
24 June – Avro 748 makes its first flight at Woodford.
26 June – British Somaliland gains independence from the United Kingdom. Five days later, it unites with the former Italian Somaliland to create the modern Somali Republic.
28 June – 38 miners killed in an explosion at Six Bells Colliery in Monmouthshire.
30 June – The musical Oliver! by Lionel Bart has its West End opening.
July – The Shadows' instrumental Apache is released.
21 July – Francis Chichester, English navigator and yachtsman, arrives in New York aboard Gypsy Moth II having made a record solo Atlantic crossing in 40 days.
27 July – In a Cabinet reshuffle, Selwyn Lloyd is appointed Chancellor of the Exchequer and Lord Home becomes Foreign Secretary.
30 July – "Battle of Beaulieu": At a jazz festival at Beaulieu, Hampshire, fans of trad jazz come to blows with progressives.
7 August – The Bluebell Railway in Sussex begins regular operation as the first standard gauge steam-operated passenger heritage railway in the world.
16 August – Cyprus gains its independence from the United Kingdom. The Sovereign Base Areas of Akrotiri and Dhekelia remain as British Overseas Territories.
17 August – The Beatles, a five-strong male band from Liverpool, perform their first concert under this name in Hamburg, West Germany.
22 August – First performance of satirical revue Beyond the Fringe, in Edinburgh.
25 August–11 September – Great Britain and Northern Ireland competes at the Olympics in Rome and win 2 gold, 6 silver and 12 bronze medals.
September
Formal conclusion of agreement for the supply from the United States of Skybolt nuclear missiles (later abandoned) to equip Vulcan bombers in exchange for permitting establishment of a U.S. Navy base on Holy Loch in Scotland for Polaris-equipped nuclear ballistic missile submarines.
First Ten Tors expedition on Dartmoor.
10 September – ITV broadcasts the first live Football League match to be shown on television and the last for 23 years.
15 September – First traffic wardens deployed in London.
30 September–4 December – Severe flooding occurs in the valley of the River Exe and the surrounding areas of Devon, following heavy rainfall.
1 October – Nigeria gains its independence from the United Kingdom.
7 October – The second notable flood occurs in Horncastle, Lincolnshire. The town enters the UK Weather Records with the highest 180-min total rainfall at 178 mm. As of October 2010, this record remains.
8 October – The closure of the original Sheffield Tramway, leaving Blackpool as the only place in England with electric trams.
17 October – The News Chronicle ceases publication, being absorbed into the Daily Mail.
21 October (Trafalgar Day) – The Queen launches Britain's first nuclear submarine, HMS Dreadnought, at Barrow-in-Furness.

25 October – Barges collide with one of the columns of the Severn Railway Bridge in heavy fog, causing two spans of the twenty-two span steel and cast iron bridge to collapse. It is never repaired.
27 October – The film Saturday Night and Sunday Morning is released, the first of the British social-realist wave.
30 October – Michael Woodruff performs the first successful kidney transplant in the UK at the Edinburgh Royal Infirmary.
2 November – Penguin Books is found not guilty of obscenity in the Lady Chatterley's Lover case.
10 November – Lady Chatterley's Lover sells 200,000 copies in one day following its publication since being banned since 1928.
2 December – The Archbishop of Canterbury, Geoffrey Fisher, talks with Pope John XXIII in the Vatican, the first ever meeting between the leader of the Anglican Church and the Pope.
9 December – The first episode of the soap opera Coronation Street, made by Granada Television in Manchester, is aired on ITV. It will still be running past its 10,000th episode in its 60th anniversary year. Characters introduced in the first episode include Ken Barlow (William Roache), Ena Sharples (Violet Carson), Elsie Tanner (Pat Phoenix) and Annie Walker (Doris Speed).
10 December – Sir Peter Brian Medawar and Australian Sir Frank Macfarlane Burnet win the Nobel Prize in Physiology or Medicine "for discovery of acquired immunological tolerance".
31 December
The last day on which the farthing, a coin first minted in England in the 13th century, is legal tender.
The last man is called up for National Service, as Conscription ends.

Undated
Black plastic bin bags first introduced for waste collection, in Hitchin.
Little Houses Improvement Scheme launched by the National Trust for Scotland to promote conservation of vernacular architecture.

Publications
 Jean and Gareth Adamson's first Topsy and Tim children's book.
 Kingsley Amis's novel Take a Girl Like You.
 Lynne Reid Banks' novel The L-Shaped Room.
 Stan Barstow's novel A Kind of Loving.
 Lawrence Durrell's novel Clea, last of The Alexandria Quartet.
 Ian Fleming's James Bond short story collection For Your Eyes Only.
 Alan Garner's children's novel The Weirdstone of Brisingamen.
 Audrey Harvey's March Fabian Society pamphlet Casualties of the Welfare State.
 David Lodge's first novel The Picturegoers.
 Muriel Spark's novel The Ballad of Peckham Rye.
 David Storey's first novel This Sporting Life.
 Raymond Williams' novel Border Country.
 John Wyndham's novel Trouble with Lichen.

Births

January – February 
 1 January – Danny Wilson, footballer and manager
 4 January – Jane Halton, English-Australian public servant 
 6 January – Nigella Lawson, British chef and writer
 10 January – John Mann, English lawyer and politician
 13 January – Matthew Bourne, English choreographer
 18 January – Mark Rylance, English actor and theatre director
 23 January 
 Paul Blagg, English racewalker
 Paul Mason, English journalist
 29 January – Sean Kerly, British field hockey player
 31 January – George Benjamin, composer and conductor
 4 February – Siobhan Dowd, British writer and activist (died 2007)
 6 February – Harry Thompson, British comedy writer (died 2005)
 10 February – Robert Addie, actor (died 2003)
 19 February
 Prince Andrew, Duke of York
 Helen Fielding, English novelist
 20 February – Siobhain McDonagh, British Labour politician and MP for Mitcham and Morden
 21 February – Jane Tomlinson, athlete and cancer activist (died 2007)
 22 February – Paul Abbott, television screenwriter and producer

March – April
 1 March – Benedict Allen, explorer
 9 March – Louise Miller, high jumper
 10 March – Anne MacKenzie, Scottish broadcast journalist
 16 March
 Jenny Eclair, born Jenny Clare Hargreaves, comedian
 John Hemming, British Liberal Democrat politician and businessman
 23 March – Nicol Stephen, Scottish politician
 24 March – Grayson Perry, visual artist
 29 March – Marina Sirtis, actress
 2 April – Linford Christie, Jamaican-born athlete
 4 April – Jane Eaglen, soprano
 11 April – Jeremy Clarkson, journalist and television show host
 13 April – Lyn Carol Brown, Labour politician and MP for West Ham
 22 April – Gary Rhodes, restaurateur and celebrity chef (died 2019)
 26 April – Roger Taylor, new wave drummer (Duran Duran)
 28 April – Ian Rankin, Scottish crime novelist
 29 April – Phil King, rock bassist
 30 April
 Colonel Tim Collins, Northern Irish-born British Commander in Iraq
 Geoffrey Cox, Conservative politician, Attorney General for England and Wales

May – June 
 6 May – Roma Downey, Northern Irish actress and producer
 8 May – Terry Christian, broadcaster
 24 May
 Guy Fletcher, English keyboardist (Dire Straits)
 Kristin Scott Thomas, English actress
 2 June – Shaun Wallace, television personality and barrister
 4 June
 Suzy Aitchison, English actress 
 Bradley Walsh, English comedian and actor
 5 June – Julie Kirkbride, English Conservative politician and MP for Bromsgrove
 8 June – Mick Hucknall, English singer and songwriter (Simply Red)
 20 June – John Taylor, English bass guitarist (Duran Duran)
 30 June – Jack McConnell, First Minister of Scotland

July – August
 3 July – Vince Clarke, English songwriter (Depeche Mode, Yazoo and Erasure)
 11 July – Caroline Quentin, English television comedy actress
 13 July – Ian Hislop, British editor and broadcaster
 16 July – Jacqueline Gold, English businesswoman (died 2023)
 18 July – Simon Heffer, English journalist
 22 July – Barbara Cassani, American-born business executive
 27 July – Emily Thornberry, English politician
 13 August – Phil Taylor, darts player
 14 August – Sarah Brightman, English soprano singer and actress
 30 August – Ben Bradshaw, English Labour politician, Minister for Local Environment, Marine and Animal Welfare, and MP for Exeter

September – October 
 3 September – Nick Gibb, British Conservative politician, Shadow Minister of State for Schools, and MP for Bognor Regis and Littlehampton
 9 September – Hugh Grant, English actor
 10 September
Margaret Ferrier, Scottish National Party politician
Colin Firth, English actor
 16 September – Danny John-Jules, English dancer and actor
 17 September – Damon Hill, English racing driver
 24 September – Tony Juniper, English environmentalist and politician
 29 September – Andy Slaughter, British Labour politician and MP for Ealing, Acton and Shepherd's Bush (2005–10) and Hammersmith (2010–)
 6 October – Richard Jobson, Scottish rock singer-songwriter, filmmaker and television presenter (Skids)
 15 October – Simon Wigg, English speedway rider (died 2000)
 16 October – Graeme Sharp, Scottish football player and manager
 17 October – Guy Henry, English actor
 29 October – Finola Hughes, British actress

November – December
 5 November – Tilda Swinton, British film actress
 10 November – Neil Gaiman, English author
 15 November – Dawn Airey, broadcaster
 17 November – Jonathan Ross, English television presenter
 18 November – Kim Wilde, English singer and gardener
 20 November – Robert Dunlop, Northern Irish motorcycle racer (died 2008)
 28 November – John Galliano, British fashion designer
 30 November – Gary Lineker, English footballer and TV presenter
 2 December – Rick Savage, English bassist (Def Leppard)
 10 December – Kenneth Branagh, Northern Irish actor and director
 11 December – John Lukic, English footballer
 14 December – Chris Waddle, English footballer, commentator and newspaper columnist
 24 December – Carol Vorderman, British television presenter
 26 December – Andrew Graham-Dixon, British art historian and television presenter
 27 December – Maryam d'Abo, British actress
 31 December – Steve Bruce, footballer and football manager

Undated 
 Shaun Greenhalgh, English art forger

Deaths
 3 January – Constance Spry, English florist (born 1886)
 7 January – Dorothea Douglass Lambert Chambers, English tennis player (born 1878)
 9 January – Elsie J. Oxenham, English children's novelist (born 1880)
 11 January – Isabel Emslie Hutton, Scottish nurse in Serbia during World War I and psychiatrist (born 1887)
 12 January – Nevil Shute, English novelist and aeronautical engineer (born 1899) (died in Australia)
 25 January – Rutland Boughton, English composer (born 1878)
 8 February
 J. L. Austin, English philosopher of language (born 1911) (lung cancer)
 Sir Giles Gilbert Scott, English architect (born 1880)
 20 February – Sir Leonard Woolley, English archaeologist (born 1880)
 29 February – Edwina Mountbatten, Countess Mountbatten of Burma, last Vicereine of India (born 1901)
 5 April – Peter Llewelyn-Davies, British soldier and inspiration for Peter Pan (born 1897)
 1 May
 Harold Bradfield, English Anglican prelate, Bishop of Bath and Wells (died in office) (born 1898)
 Charles Holden, architect (born 1875)
 8 May
 Sir Hersch Lauterpacht, international lawyer (born 1897 in Ukraine)
 J. H. C. Whitehead, mathematician (born 1904 in Madras) (heart attack at Princeton, NJ)
 7 June – Sir Maurice Bonham Carter, English Liberal politician and cricketer (born 1880)
 27 June
 Lottie Dod, English sportswoman (born 1871)
 Harry Pollitt, English communist (born 1890)
 6 July – Aneurin Bevan, Welsh Labour politician (born 1897)
 24 August – Sir Harold Bowden, businessman and inventor (born 1880)
 24 August – Sir Charles Lambe, admiral of the fleet, First Sea Lord (born 1900)
 28 August – Charles Forbes, admiral (born 1880)
 22 September
 Melanie Klein, Austrian-born psychoanalyst (born 1882)
 Amy Veness, English film actress (born 1876)
 27 September – Sylvia Pankhurst, English suffragette (born 1882)
 30 September – St John Philby, British Arabist, explorer and spy (born 1885 in Ceylon) (died in Beirut)
 16 November – Gilbert Harding, radio and television personality (born 1907) (asthma attack outside Broadcasting House)
 13 December – Dora Marsden, radical feminist and modernist literary editor (born 1882)
 20 December – Sir Godfrey Ince, civil servant (born 1891)
 22 December – Sir Ninian Comper, architect (born 1864)

See also
 1960 in British music
 1960 in British television
 List of British films of 1960

References

 
Years of the 20th century in the United Kingdom